The 2001 season was Club de Regatas Vasco da Gama's 103rd year in existence, the club's 86th season in existence of football, and the club's 31st season playing in the Brasileirão Série A, the top flight of Brazilian football.

Vasco da Gama was not able to be on Copa do Brasil due to be on Copa Libertadores and its scheduling conflicts.

Players

Squad information 
As of 31 December 2001

Pre-season and friendlies

Competitions

Brasileirão Série A

League stage

League table

Result summary

Result round by round

Matches

Copa Libertadores 

Vasco da Gama joined the competition in the group stage.

Group stage

Knockout phase

Campeonato do Estado do Rio de Janeiro

Taça Guanabara

Taça Rio de Janeiro

Championship phase

Copa Mercosur

Group stage

Torneio Rio de Janeiro – São Paulo

Group stage

See also 
 2001 Torneio Rio de Janeiro – São Paulo
 2001 Campeonato do Estado do Rio de Janeiro
 2001 Copa Libertadores
 2001 Copa Mercosur
 2001 Brasileirão Série A

References

External links 
 

CR Vasco da Gama
Club de Regatas Vasco da Gama seasons
Vasco da Gama